Botswana competed at the 2022 Commonwealth Games at Birmingham, England from 28 July to 8 August 2022. It was Botswana's 12th appearance at the Games.

A team of 36 athlete will represent Botswana, the largest ever team the country has sent to the Commonwealth Games. However, only 33 athletes competed.

Bayapo Ndori and Aratwa Kasemang were the country's flagbearers during the opening ceremony.

Medalists

Competitors
The following is the list of number of competitors participating at the Games per sport/discipline.

Athletics

A squad of seventeen athletes was confirmed as of 1 July 2022.

Men
Track and road events

Field events

Women
Track and road events

Boxing

A squad of five boxers was confirmed as of 1 July 2022.

Cycling

A squad of two cyclists was confirmed as of 1 July 2022.

Road
Men

Mountain Biking

Judo

A squad of two judoka was confirmed as of 1 July 2022.

Lawn bowls

A squad of four bowlers was confirmed as of 1 July 2022.

Women

Squash

A squad of two players was confirmed as of 1 July 2022.

Swimming

A squad of three swimmers was confirmed as of 1 July 2022.

Men

Women

Weightlifting

One weightlifter qualified through his position in the IWF Commonwealth Ranking List (as of 9 March 2022).

References

External links
Botswana National Olympic Committee Official site

Nations at the 2022 Commonwealth Games
2022
2022 in Botswana sport